Buckaroo: The Winchester Does Not Forgive (also known as A Winchester Does Not Forgive) is a 1967 Italian Spaghetti Western film directed by Adelchi Bianchi  and starring  Dean Reed.

Plot

Cast 

 Dean Reed as Buckaroo
 Monica Brugger as   Annie
 Livio Lorenzon as  Lash
 Ugo Sasso as  Johnny

References

External links

Buckaroo: The Winchester Does Not Forgive at Variety Distribution

Spaghetti Western films
1967 Western (genre) films
1967 films
Films directed by Adelchi Bianchi
Films scored by Lallo Gori
1960s Italian films